A gubernatorial election was held on 15 April 1967 to elect the Governor of Saga Prefecture. Incumbent Sunao Ikeda defeated communist candidate Kōzō Eguchi.

Candidates
 - incumbent Governor of Saga Prefecture, age 65
 - House of Councillors candidate in 1950, 1965, and later 1968, age 58

Results

References

Saga gubernatorial elections
1967 elections in Japan